We Don't Live Here Anymore is a 2004 drama film directed by John Curran and starring Mark Ruffalo, Laura Dern, Peter Krause, and Naomi Watts. It is based on the short stories We Don't Live Here Anymore and Adultery by Andre Dubus.

Set in Washington state, the film was shot around Vancouver, British Columbia, Canada. It premiered at the 2004 Sundance Film Festival, where it was honored with the Waldo Salt Award for Best Screenplay. Warner Independent Pictures gave the film a limited release in theaters on August 13, 2004.

Plot
Jack and Hank are two friends who teach literature at the local university. They regularly meet for dinner as a quartet with their respective wives, Terry (married to Jack) and Edith (married to Hank). Edith and Jack embark on an affair, which Terry starts to become suspicious about but doesn’t outright confront her husband either. Instead, she gets closer to Hank, who is himself a womanizer. When Jack learns his wife has slept with Hank, he does not erupt in anger as Terry expected, and his indifferent reaction upsets Terry. The two couples must contend with the entanglements of their deceits and betrayals.

Cast
Mark Ruffalo as Jack Linden
Laura Dern as Terry Linden
Peter Krause as Hank Evans
Naomi Watts as Edith Evans
 Sam Charles as Sean Linden
 Ginger Page as Natasha Linden
 Jennifer Bishop as Sharon Evans
 Amber Rothwell as Lauren

Production
Naomi Watts, who had been longtime friends with director John Curran, had the choice of lead roles. She declined to play Terry because she had just finished filming “the emotionally draining” 21 Grams. Laura Dern had initial reservations about playing Terry, saying “I was halfway through the script, I thought, ‘OK, I’ve read this before. This is a great part, but the guy has this ogre wife and he’s about to get into this affair. They’re obviously going to run off together and I’ll be this boorish character who ends up alone.’” However, Curran convinced Dern that the character and her relationship with Jack would be more complex.

The film was shot in 30 days.

Reception

Release
We Don’t Live Here Anymore premiered in January 2004 at the Sundance Film Festival, where it won the Waldo Salt Screenwriting Award for Larry Gross. Warner Independent Pictures purchased distribution rights for the film and it was given a limited theatrical release on August 13, 2004.

Critical response
On review aggregate website Rotten Tomatoes, We Don’t Live Here Anymore has an approval rating of 65% based on 127 reviews. Its consensus states, "We Don't Live Here Anymore is often overly moody and grim, but it's made watchable by the strong performances for its four principal actors."

Writing for Variety, Todd McCarthy said "Ruffalo, in his underplayed manner, fully reveals the man in all his desires, hesitations and heartaches in relation to both his wife and lover. He's matched exceptionally well by the shimmering Watts, who once again displays her quicksilver acting ability to slip from one telling mood to the next. She has superb moments here."

In his review, Roger Ebert was more critical, writing the film’s problem is "that it's too desultory. Maybe the point of the Dubus stories was to show perfunctory transgressions between characters not sufficiently motivated to accept the consequences. They approach adultery the way they might approach a treadmill, jumping on, punching the speed and incline buttons, working up a sweat, coming back down to level, slowing to a walk, and then deciding the damn thing isn't worth the trouble." However, he added, "What must be said is that the actors are better than the material. There are four specific people here, each one closely observed and carefully realized. Ruffalo's Jack, driven by his lust, finds his needs fascinating to himself; Naomi Watts' Edith finds them fascinating to her. Terry and Hank seem almost forced into their halfhearted affair, and Laura Dern and Peter Krause are precise in the way they show dutiful excitement in each other's presence, while Dern vibrates with anger and passion in her arguments with her husband."

Accolades 
Laura Dern won Best Supporting Actress at the Boston Society of Film Critics Awards, in a tie with Sharon Warren for Ray.

References

External links
 Official website 
 
 We Don't Live Here Anymore at AllMovie
 
 

2004 films
2004 romantic drama films
American romantic drama films
Films based on short fiction
Films based on multiple works
Films directed by John Curran
Films scored by Michael Convertino
Films set in Washington (state)
Films shot in Vancouver
Warner Independent Pictures films
Sundance Film Festival award winners
American independent films
2004 independent films
2000s English-language films
2000s American films
Adultery in films
Films about couples